Major-general Clement Delves Hill (6 December 178120 January 1845) was a British Army Officer who fought at the 1815 Battle of Waterloo and later saw service in India.

Career
The sixth son of Sir John Hill Bt. and Mary, co-heir and daughter of John Chambré of Petton, Shropshire, he was born on 6December 1781 at Hawkstone Hall near Prees Shropshire.

He joined the Royal Horse Guards (Blue) as a cornet on 22August 1805 and was promoted to lieutenant on 6March 1806. Promotion to captain followed on 4April 1811; to major on 19December 1811; to lieutenant-colonel on 30December 1813; to colonel on 21June 1827 and to major-general on 10January 1837.

After arriving in Portugal he served throughout the Peninsular War as aide-de-camp to his elder brother Lord Hill and was slightly wounded during the campaign.

He was present at the Battle of Waterloo where he was wounded when a sword was thrust through his thigh, pinioning him to the ground.

In India, he commanded the Mysore Division of the Madras Army under the Marquess of Tweeddale from 24November 1841.

Death
Hill died at the falls of Guersoppa in the Indian state of Karnataka on 20January 1845 aged 63 and was buried at Honavar on the 22January.

There is a colossal monument erected in honour of Colonel Hill in Honavar.

Locals are trying hard to preserve the column and grave in Honavar.

There is a commemorative tablet dedicated to Hill in St Chad's Church, Prees.

Family
His brothers Rowland, Thomas and Robert all followed military careers and were present at the Battle of Waterloo.

He is not the same Clement Delves Hill who on 26 June 1841 Hill married Harriet Emma Charlotte, only daughter of sportsman and eccentric John Mytton (1796–1834). This man was actually Maj.-Gen. Clement Delves Hill's nephew, the youngest son of his brother John Hill and Elizabeth Cornish Rhodes.

References

Bibliography

1781 births
1845 deaths
British Army personnel of the Napoleonic Wars
Royal Horse Guards officers
British Army major generals
Military personnel from Shropshire